Federal Highway 117D is the designation for two toll highways in eastern Mexico.

San Martín Texmelucan-Tlaxcala-El Molinito
The first of the two roads connects San Martín Texmelucan, Puebla to El Molinito, northeast of Tlaxcala City and southwest of Apizaco. The road is operated by Promotora y Operadora de Infraestructura S.A. de C.V. (PINFRA). A toll of 63 pesos per car is charged to travel between Texmelucan and Tlaxcala.

Libramiento de Tlaxcala

The  Libramiento de Tlaxcala serves as a southern bypass of the city, connecting the highway to Texmelucan, the state toll road between Puebla and Tlaxcala, and Mexican Federal Highway 121. It was inaugurated on March 27, 2015. The bypass's construction began in 2009, with three kilometers remaining unfinished from 2012 to 2015.

References 

Mexican Federal Highways